The huge moth family Noctuidae contains the following genera:

A B C D E F G H I J K L M N O P Q R S T U V W X Y Z

Dacira
Dactyloplusia
Daddala
Dadica
Daedalina
Dagassa
Dahlia
Dallolmoia
Dandaca
Dantona
Daona
Dapha
Daphoenura
Darceta
Darcetina
Dargeochaeta
Dargida
Daseochaeta
Daseuplexia
Dasyblemma
Dasycampa
Dasyerges
Dasygaster
Dasymixis
Dasypolia
Dasyspoudaea
Dasysternum
Dasythorax
Data
Datungia
Daubeplusia
Daula
Davea
Debrosania
Decarynodes
Decelea
Deceptria
Decticryptis
Dectocraspedon
Deinhugia
Deinopa
Deinopalpus
Deinypena
Delgamma
Delocoma
Deltote
Dentilymnia
Deobriga
Depalpata
Deremma
Dermaleipa
Derrima
Desana
Desertoplusia
Desertullia
Desmophora
Despumosia
Deva
Devena
Dexiadena
Diachrysia
Diadochia
Diadocis
Diagrapta
Dialithis
Diallagma
Dialoxa
Dialta
Diamuna
Dianobia
Dianthivora
Diapera
Diaphone
Diapolia
Diarsia
Diascia
Diascoides
Diastema
Diastreptoneura
Diasyngrapha
Diataraxia
Diatenes
Dicerogastra
Dichagramma
Dichagyris
Dichonia
Dichoniopsis
Dichonioxa
Dichromia
Dicopis
Dictyestra
Dicycla
Dida
Dierna
Diethusa
Diloba
Dimorphicosmia
Dimorphinoctua
Dinoprora
Dinumma
Diodines
Diomea
Diopa
Dioszeghyana
Diparopsis
Dipaustica
Diphteramoma
Diphthera
Diphtherocome
Dipinacia
Diplodira
Diplonephra
Diplothecta
Dipterygina
Diptheroides
Discestra
Dischalis
Discosema
Dissimactebia
Dissolophus
Disticta
Ditrogoptera
Divaena
Divercala
Dnopheropis
Docela
Dochmiogramma
Doerriesa
Dogninades
Dolichosomastis
Dolocucullia
Donacesa
Donda
Donuca
Donuctenusa
Dordura
Dorika
Dorsippa
Dorstiana
Doryodes
Dosa
Douzdrina
Dragana
Draganodes
Drasteria
Drasteriodes
Draudtia
Draudtiana
Drepanoblemma
Drepanofoda
Drepanopalpia
Drepanoperas
Drepanophiletis
Drepanopses
Drepanorhina
Drobeta
Drucuma
Dryobota
Dryobotodes
Dryotype
Dubiphane
Dugaria
Duhemia
Dunira
Duriga
Dusponera
Dymba
Dyomyx
Dyops
Dypterygia
Dyrzela
Dysaletia
Dysedia
Dysglyptogona
Dysgnathia
Dysgonia
Dysgraphhadena
Dysmilichia
Dysocnemis
Dyspyralis
Dysthymia

References 

 Natural History Museum Lepidoptera genus database

 
Noctuid genera D